is a Japanese professional baseball infielder for the Tohoku Rakuten Golden Eagles in Japan's Nippon Professional Baseball.

External links

NPB stats

1988 births
Japanese baseball players
Living people
Nippon Professional Baseball infielders
Baseball people from Sendai
Tohoku Rakuten Golden Eagles players